The fifth-generation Honda CR-V is a compact crossover SUV manufactured by Honda since 2016, replacing the fourth-generation CR-V. It was first unveiled on 13 October 2016 in Detroit, United States. Honda began producing the CR-V at East Liberty, Ohio at the East Liberty Auto Plant in November 2016 and at Greensburg, Indiana at the Honda Manufacturing of Indiana plant during February 2017. The fifth-generation of CR-V is available in 5-seater and 7-seater variant in markets other than North America.

Markets 
Sales began in the U.S. on 21 December 2016 as a 2017 model year.  While most North American market cars are made in the ELAP, HMIN or HCM plants, some, albeit relatively very few, are assembled in Saitama, Japan.

The fifth generation CR-V was also launched in Thailand on 24 March 2017 and in Indonesia on 27 April 2017 at the 25th Indonesia International Motor Show. Indonesian models went on sale on 17 June 2017. The Indonesian model top trim (Prestige) is equipped with 5-spoke 18-inch Modulo alloy wheels not seen in other markets.

In the Philippines, the 1.6-litre i-DTEC diesel engine manages 120 PS and 300 Nm of torque.

The  CR-V Hybrid was unveiled at the 2017 Auto Shanghai in China in April 2017.

On 12 July 2017, Honda Malaysia launched the fifth generation CR-V with four trim levels. After two years, Honda Malaysia launched the CR-V Mugen Limited Edition.

The fifth generation CR-V was also launched in Japan on 30 August 2018 and went on sale on the following day, making it the return of the CR-V for the Japanese domestic market after a two-year hiatus since the fourth generation CR-V was discontinued there in August 2016. It was previously displayed on 27 October 2017 at the 2017 Tokyo Motor Show, announced on 29 September 2017.

The European market CR-V was shown at Geneva Motor Show in March 2018 and went on sale in September, including a seven-seat variant. The CR-V hybrid, which was previewed at the 2017 Frankfurt Motor Show, went on sale in early 2019 with a fuel economy comparable to diesel competitors. Honda expects sales to split equally between gasoline and hybrid in three years.

Equipment 
In the American market, Honda Sensing package, which includes features like Adaptive Cruise Control (ACC), Collision Mitigation Braking (CMBS) and Lane Keeping Assist (LKAS), is standard on EX and above trims; the package was formerly reserved to the Touring trim prior to the fifth generation release. New safety features introduced include: Blind Spot Information (BSI) with Rear Cross Traffic Monitor (CTM), replacing the LaneWatch system from the previous generation CR-V, and Auto High Beam (HSS) headlights. Honda Sensing is standard on all CR-V trim levels for 2020 and adds traffic sign recognition.

LED daytime running lights, 18" alloy wheels and electronic parking brake with a new auto-hold feature are available. Additional, new features include 4-way driver's seat power lumbar, a power lift-gate, active grille shutter system to reduce aerodynamic drag, Android Auto/Apple CarPlay on a 7-inch touch screen display with volume knob, 7-inch TFT instrument display and LED headlights.

Facelift 
Honda unveiled a refreshed CR-V on 18 September 2019, initially for the North American market. For the first time in North America, the refreshed model introduced a hybrid powertrain as an option. However, the hybrid model is not introduced in Canada. The CR-V Hybrid features a 2.0-liter Atkinson-cycle four-cylinder gasoline engine with Honda's i-MMD hybrid system. The hybrid version is assembled at Honda's Greensburg, Indiana assembly plant which also produces the standard gasoline-only CR-V, while the powertrain is assembled in Anna, Ohio. The previously-available 2.4-liter naturally-aspirated gasoline engine that powered the base LX trim is dropped from the CR-V lineup for 2020. The LX trim is still available in Canada with a 1.5-liter engine. Additionally, the CR-V's suite of advanced safety features are standard on every trim level, meaning even the most affordable CR-V provides adaptive cruise control and the latest crash prevention technology. The gasoline-only CR-V went on sale at Honda dealerships across North America starting in late fall 2019, while the CR-V Hybrid went on sale in early 2020.

Other changes for the 2020 CR-V include larger 19-inch alloy wheels on top-line Touring models, redesigned 18-inch alloy wheels for EX and EX-L trims, a revised front fascia with a new upper grille (which also features a blue-outlined Honda 'H' emblem on CR-V Hybrid models), revised side skirts with chrome inserts, a new rear bumper with chrome insert, a push button-controlled CVT for CR-V Hybrid models, LED front fog lamps on most models (except on the base LX trim), new exterior color options and standard Honda Sensing driver assistance technology for all models.

The facelifted CR-V was also released in Thailand on 14 July 2020, including the panoramic sunroof, wireless charger, Honda Sensing, automatic-dimming rear-view mirror and memory seat, and the 1.6 DT-E FWD was discontinued. In August 2021, Honda launched the CR-V Black Edition in Thailand, giving buyers a choice of a fully blacked out variant of the popular family SUV. Power comes from the long-serving 2.4-liter i-VTEC and a CVT combo. The Black Edition loses out on Honda Sensing which is fitted to the top-spec turbodiesel variant, though still has a panoramic glass roof.

In Malaysia, the facelifted CR-V was launched on 5 November 2020, which gets some minor styling changes and new features. The SUV's variant line-up also sees a revision, with just three options available instead of four previously. The base variant remains the 2.0 2WD. The remaining two variants are both turbocharged, 1.5 TC-P 2WD and the new 1.5 TC-P 4WD as the range-topping variant. In October 2021, Honda Malaysia unveiled a new model for the CR-V called the Black Edition based on the 1.5 TC-P 2WD variant.

The facelifted CR-V was also released in Indonesia on 18 February 2021, including Honda Sensing for Prestige variant, standard LED headlamps and foglamps for all variants, along with 5-inch TFT instrument cluster and 7-inch touchscreen display for 1.5 Turbo and 1.5 Turbo Prestige variants. The Prestige variant no longer has Modulo wheels and now shares the same new wheel design with the 1.5 Turbo variant while the 2.0 variant retained the pre-facelift wheels. In December 2021, Honda launched the Black Edition variant in Indonesia.

Honda Breeze 
The Chinese market variant with different front and rear fascias is called the Honda Breeze, produced and sold by Guangqi Honda. It was launched on 18 October 2019. The Breeze is also available as a hybrid and is sold alongside the international facelift version CR-V produced by Dongfeng Honda.

Powertrain 
The turbocharged engine delivers peak torque between 2,000rpm and 5,000rpm whereas the naturally-aspirated engine delivers its peak torque at 3,900rpm. U.S. and Canada models are only available with continuously variable transmission. For the 2020 model year, Honda has made the 1.5-litre engine standard on all CR-V trim levels sold in the United States and Canada. In some markets, the CR-V is also available with a 1.6-litre Honda i-DTEC turbodiesel option, producing  paired to a ZF 9HP transversely-mounted 9-speed automatic transmission. The i-DTEC turbodiesel engine has been revised from having a single variable-nozzle turbocharger in the earlier version to having two turbochargers - one for low RPMs and the other for high RPMs - to minimize turbo lag. It uses an aluminum cylinder head paired to an open-deck cylinder block, with shorter and thinner piston skirts to reduce mechanical friction to levels comparable to a gasoline engine.

Safety

References 

Cars introduced in 2016
Motor vehicles manufactured in the United States
Vehicles with CVT transmission